The S20 is a railway service that runs every half-hour between  and  in the Swiss canton of Ticino. Treni Regionali Ticino Lombardia (TILO), a joint venture of Swiss Federal Railways and Trenord, operates the service.

Operations 

References

External links 
 
 Official site

Rail transport in Ticino